Luis Eduardo Moreno Moreno (28 October 1934 – 9 May 1996) was a Colombian preacher, co-founder and 1st Ministry of the Church of God Ministry of Jesus Christ.

Commonly known as Brother Luis, he was the first husband of the Colombian Christian leader Maria Luisa Piraquive and father of senator Alexandra Moreno Piraquive.

Biography 
Luis Eduardo Moreno was born on 28 October 1934 in Pereira, capital of the Risaralda department. Although his family was Catholic, he started to assist to various Pentecostal churches when he became an adult. In these churches he had disagreements with the religious leaders due to the way in which they managed the congregations. In 1965 he met Maria Luisa Piraquive, whom he married a year later. In 1972 he co-founded with his mother, wife and other believers, the Church of God Ministry of Jesus Christ.
Moreno died on 9 May 1996 in Bogota due to a heart attack.

References

External links 
Official website of the Church of God Ministry of Jesus Christ International (History)
Reseña histórica videograbación en YouTube

1934 births
1996 deaths
20th-century religious leaders
Christian creationists
Colombian Pentecostals
Colombian religious leaders
Evangelists
Founders of new religious movements
Members of the Church of God Ministry of Jesus Christ International
People from Pereira, Colombia
Converts to evangelical Christianity from Roman Catholicism
Converts to Pentecostal denominations